Guanqiao Town is a rural town in Liuyang City, Hunan Province, People's Republic of China. The town is bordered to the north and northwest by Zhentou Town, to the east by Puji Town, and to the south by Lusong District of Zhuzhou.

Administrative division
The town is divided into four villages and one community, the following areas:
 Jizhen Community
 Sugu Village
 Yijiang Village
 Bajiaoting Village
 Shihuizui Village

Economy
The main industries in and around the town are forestry and farming.

Geography
Liuyang River, also known as the mother river, flows through the town.

Xiashan Reservoir is the largest body of water and the largest reservoir in the town.

Mount Daniuling is a mountain in the town.

Education
 Guanqiao Middle School

Transportation

Railway
The Shanghai–Kunming railway passes across the town north to south.

The Hangzhou–Changsha high-speed railway, which connects Hangzhou and Changsha, running through the town north to south.

Expressway
The Shanghai–Kunming Expressway which heads south to Kunming, passing through the town.

The Liuyang–Liling Expressway is a north–south expressway in the town.

Religion
Zhong Kui Temple is a Taoist temple in the town for worship of Zhong Kui.

References

Divisions of Liuyang
Liuyang